Dongzikou is a station on Line 5 of the Chengdu Metro in China. It was opened on December 27, 2019.

References

Railway stations in Sichuan
Railway stations in China opened in 2019
Chengdu Metro stations